Caboclo means a person having copper-coloured skin in Brazilian Portuguese. Caboclo may also refer to
Bruno Caboclo (born 1995), Brazilian basketball player
Faroeste Caboclo, a 1979 song recorded by Brazilian rock band Legião Urbana
Brazilian corvette Caboclo (V19) , an Imperial corvette of the Brazilian Navy